Mai Atafo is a Nigerian fashion tailor, noted for his brand, Mai Atafo.. He attended the Leeds-based Savile Row Academy to train as a tailor.

Personal life
Atafo was born in Ile-Ife, Osun State to a family of 9 children. He is married to Christine Atafo. They have one child.

Career 
Atafo, upon returning from the United Kingdom in 2002 worked in various positions in the marketing department at British American Tobacco Nigeria. In 2006 he left to Guinness Nigeria where he sat as Brand Manager as of his resignation in 2010.

Before leaving Guinness Nigeria, Atafo started the clothing label "Mai Atafo Inspired", that gained attention from celebrities such as Omowunmi Akinnifesi, Banky W, IK Osakioduwa and others. He sat briefly as Fashion Editor for Genevieve Magazine.

In 2011, Mai Atafo Inspired launched a wedding line called "Weddings by Mai".

Atafo is the Creative Director of Mai Atafo Inspired. He is Strategy Director for the advertising agency Firehouse Group, and is acted as emcee for the Miss Nigeria Pageant in 2010. Atafo heads the Future Awards Central working committee.

Awards and nominations

Atafo has been recognized around Africa for his contributions to fashion design and style.

2009 City People Fashion and Style, Hottest New Male Designer
2010 City People Fashion and Style, Special Recognition.
2010 Mode Men Fashion Designer of the Year
2010 Mode Men, Best Dressed Man of the Year
2010 FAB Magazine, Fashion Brand of the Year
2010 Covenant University "Redefining Fashion Contribution"
2011 Allure, Most Stylish Man of the Year
2011 Thisday Style, Best Dressed Man
2013 GLITZ, Designer of the year
2015 Heineken Lagos Fashion and Design Week, Menswear Designer of the Year 
2016 - Abryanz Style and Fashion Awards, Fashion Designer of the year - West Africa
2017 - Abryanz Style and Fashion Awards Lifestyle/Style Fashion Icon Achievement Award

References

Nigerian fashion designers
Living people
People from Ife
Nigerian tailors
Alumni of City, University of London
Federal Government College Idoani alumni
Year of birth missing (living people)